Canadian Forces Northern Area Headquarters (CFNA HQ) Yellowknife is a Canadian Forces unit located in the city of Yellowknife, Northwest Territories.

Situated in Evans Building of the city of Yellowknife, it is the headquarters for Joint Task Force North, part of Canadian Joint Operations Command responsible for Canadian Forces operations and administration in Northern Canada and the Arctic.

There are 52 military and civilian personnel from 1 Canadian Rangers Patrol Group headquarters and 314 military and civilian personnel from Joint Task Force North currently stationed in Yellowknife responsible for coordinating military operations across  of land in the Northwest Territories and Nunavut.

Canadian Forces Northern Area Headquarters Whitehorse has a similar responsibility in Yukon.

As of 2021 the current base Commander is Brigadier-General Pascal Godbout.

History 
The Canadian Forces Northern Area Headquarters Yellowknife was established on 15 May 1970 to assist and maintain Canadian sovereignty north of the 60th parallel and support Canadian Armed Forces operations in the north.

Associated units 
CFNA Yellowknife is home to:

Joint Task Force North
1 Canadian Ranger Patrol Group
440 Transport Squadron
Yellowknife Company, The Loyal Edmonton Regiment (4th Battalion, Princess Patricia's Canadian Light Infantry)
Area Support Unit (North)

Future headquarters expansion 
In 2018, Department of National Defence spokesman Andrew McKelvey announced a new building project. Canadian Forces Northern Area Headquarters Yellowknife will see the construction of a  building for some of the technical services elements of the Joint Task Force North Area Support Unit, and the 1st Canadian Rangers Patrol Group.

The overall project is estimated to cost between $50 and $99 million and will include:

offices
an assembly space, which will double as a drill hall
warehouse
garage space
Construction is expected to start in the 2020-2021 time frame, with opening anticipated by 2024.

References

External links 

Canadian Forces Northern Area
440 Transport Squadron
Canadian Joint Operations Command (CJOC)
The Yellowknife Company / Loyal Edmonton Regiment and 1 Field Ambulance Detachment Yellowknife

Canadian Forces bases in the Northwest Territories
Canadian Forces